{{Infobox person
| name = Kundan Shah
|image = Kundan Shah.jpg
|imagesize = 
| birth_date = 19 October 1947
| birth_place = Bombay, Bombay State, India
| death_date = 
| death_place = Mumbai, Maharashtra, India
| occupation = Director, screenwriter
| yearsactive = 1983–2014
| spouse =  
| children =  
| awards = 1983 Indira Gandhi Award for Best Debut Film of a Director – Jaane Bhi Do Yaaro 1994 Filmfare Critics Award for Best Movie – Kabhi Haan Kabhi Naa}}

Kundan Shah (19 October 1947 – 7 October 2017)  was an Indian film director and writer.
He is known for his comedy classic Jaane Bhi Do Yaaro (1983) and his 1986–1987, TV series Nukkad with Saeed Akhtar Mirza.

Biography
Kundan Shah was born in a Gujarati family.

Shah studied direction at the Film and Television Institute of India in Pune and he developed an interest in the comedy genre.

His directorial debut was the comedy film Jaane Bhi Do Yaaro (aka Who Pays the Piper) in 1983. He also was the co-writer of the film, with Satish Kaushik. The film introduced Indian cinema to satirical comedy for the first time and was well accepted as not being slapstick.

Shah then started to work in television. He was one of the directors of the popular sitcom Yeh Jo Hai Zindagi, which started telecast in August 1984. He became a partner of Iskra, a company founded by Saeed Akhtar Mirza, Aziz Mirza and others. In 1985–1986 he directed the TV series Nukkad (street) along with Saeed Akhtar Mirza. The serial was another folk comedy dealing with the routine life of street youngsters. In 1987 he directed another television serial named "Manoranjan", the comedy serial was based on film industry and became an instant hit. In 1988, he started directing sitcom, Wagle Ki Duniya, based on cartoonist, R. K. Laxman's character, the common man, starring Anjan Srivastav.

After directing several serials, Shah took a long break of 7 years from cinema.

Shah made his comeback to cinema in 1993. He directed the famous Kabhi Haan Kabhi Naa and wrote the screenplay for the film. The film was another comic love story but it also displayed new aspects to its credit – it was the first time that the hero in the film was an absolute loser. The film starred Shahrukh Khan in one of his first roles. The film was much acclaimed and both Shah and Khan were appreciated for their work. In 1994, Shah won the Filmfare Critics Award for Best Movie for the film. He was the first filmmaker to win this award.

In 1998, Shah directed another acclaimed film, Kya Kehna. Due to delay, the film released in 2000 and became the surprise hit of the year. The film dealt with the socially controversial issue of single parenthood and premarital pregnancy. Preity Zinta gave a critically appreciated performance in the lead role of a teenage single-mother who tries to overcome the values of her society. This was to be her debut film but, due to the delay in release, she instead debuted in Dil Se..., followed by Soldier. The film also starred Saif Ali Khan and Chandrachur Singh.

Shah's next releases were Hum To Mohabbat Karega in 2000, starring Bobby Deol and Karisma Kapoor, Dil Hai Tumhaara in 2002, starring Rekha, Preity Zinta, Arjun Rampal, Mahima Chaudhry, and Jimmy Shergill, and Ek Se Badhkar Ek in 2004, starring Suniel Shetty and Raveena Tandon. While the second film received generally positive reviews, none of the films fared well at the box office.

Awards
National Film Award – Indira Gandhi Award for Best Debut Film of a Director – Jaane Bhi Do YaaroFilmfare Award for Best Film (Critics) – Kabhi Haan Kabhi Naa''

Filmography

References

External links

1947 births
2017 deaths
Film directors from Mumbai
Hindi-language film directors
Filmfare Awards winners
Film and Television Institute of India alumni
Indian television directors
Indian male screenwriters
20th-century Indian film directors
21st-century Indian film directors
Director whose film won the Best Debut Feature Film National Film Award